Pierre Trần Đình Tứ is a Vietnamese prelate. He is currently the Bishop Emeritus of Phú Cường and the Head of the Episcopal Committee on the Divine Worship.

Biography
Pierre Tứ was born on 2 March 1937 in Thái Bình, Vietnam. In 1948, he went to My Duc Minor Seminary. From 1954 to 1957, he was sent to study philosophy in Hong Kong. After his return to Vietnam, he studied theology at Saint Joseph Major Seminary in Sai Gon (now Ho Chi Minh City) from 1961 to 1965.

On 29 April 1965, he was ordained a priest and served at parishes in Phú Cường diocese. In 1968, he was sent to Rome to further his studies and obtained a doctorate in canon law and bachelor's degree in liturgy. He then became the rector of a local major seminary from 1975 to 1988, and taught at Saint Joseph Major Seminary in Ho Chi Minh City, from 1987 to 1988.

On 5 November 1998, he was appointed Bishop of Phú Cường, the third bishop of this diocese. He was consecrated a bishop on 6 January 1999 in Rome by Pope John Paul II. He was one of the two Vietnamese bishops who got consecrated by the Pope in Rome, the other was Jean-Baptiste Nguyễn Bá Tòng, the first Vietnamese bishop.

On 30 June 2012, Pope Benedict XVI accepted Pierre Tứ's resignation due to age limit, and named Joseph Nguyễn Tấn Tước his successor.

References

External links 
Catholic Hierarchy: Bishop Pierre Trần Đình Tứ
Biography on Phú Cường Diocese's website

Notes

1937 births
Living people
20th-century Roman Catholic bishops in Vietnam
21st-century Roman Catholic bishops in Vietnam